Corroboreethrips is a genus of thrips in the family Phlaeothripidae.

Species
 Corroboreethrips kallus
 Corroboreethrips siagonus
 Corroboreethrips stomius
 Corroboreethrips subsolanus
 Corroboreethrips suspectus

References

Phlaeothripidae
Thrips
Thrips genera
Taxa named by Laurence Alfred Mound